Jimmy Oligny (born April 30, 1993) is a Canadian professional ice hockey defenceman who is currently playing for and serving as the captain of the Manitoba Moose of the American Hockey League (AHL).

Playing career
Oligny was drafted seventh overall by the Prince Edward Island Rocket in the 2009 QMJHL Draft.

After his third season with the Prince Edward Island Rocket, Oligny was traded to the Rimouski Océanic in exchange for a first-round pick and a fourth-round pick in the 2014 QMJHL Draft. While playing for the Océanic, Oligny was nominated for the Kevin-Lowe Trophy as the league's best defensive defenseman.

After playing one season with the Rimouski Océanic for the 2013–14 season, Oligny turned professional by signing with the Milwaukee Admirals of the American Hockey League (AHL).

Oligny was named the Admirals Man Of The Year at the conclusion of the 2015–16 season. The following season, Oligny re-signed a two-year American Hockey League contract with the Milwaukee Admirals.

As a free agent in 2018, Oligny signed his first NHL contract, agreeing to terms with the Vegas Golden Knights on a one-year, entry-level deal and joined their AHL affiliate team, the Chicago Wolves, to begin the 2018–19 season. Oligny was placed on the third defensive pairing for the Wolves, posting 1 assist in 16 games before he was dealt by the Golden Knights to the Winnipeg Jets in exchange for future considerations on January 3, 2019. He was immediately reassigned to AHL affiliate, the Manitoba Moose.

On June 25, 2019, Oligny was not tendered a qualifying offer from the Jets, releasing him as a free agent. After exploring his options, Oligny opted to remain within the Jets organization, signing a one-year AHL contract extension with the Moose on July 3, 2019.

Career statistics

Regular season and playoffs

International

References

External links

1993 births
Living people
Canadian ice hockey defencemen
Chicago Wolves players
Cincinnati Cyclones (ECHL) players
Manitoba Moose players
Milwaukee Admirals players
P.E.I. Rocket players
Rimouski Océanic players